Funk This is the eleventh studio album by American singer Chaka Khan. It was first released by Burgundy Records on September 25, 2007 in the United States. On October 13, 2007 the album entered at its peak position of number fifteen on the Billboard 200 and number five on the Top R&B/Hip-Hop Albums. On December 6, 2007, the album was nominated for Best R&B Album at the 2008 Grammy Awards, while "Disrespectful" was nominated for Best R&B Performance by a Duo or Group with Vocals. Both nominations resulted in wins for Khan. By February 2008, "Funk This" had sold 160,000 copies in the US according to Nielsen SoundScan.

The double A-side singles "Disrespectful" (featuring Mary J. Blige) and "Angel" were released to radio and made digitally available on iTunes in advance of the album release. Following the success of the initial double A-side single, the duet with Michael McDonald, "You Belong to Me", was released to radio, eventually peaking at number eighteen on the Hot Contemporary Jazz Songs chart. The contemporary R&B ballad "One for All Time" reached number fifty-five on the Hot R&B/Hip-Hop Songs.

Track listing

Singles
"Disrespectful" (featuring Mary J. Blige) (2007) — #1 U.S. Dance
"Angel" (2007) — #29 U.S. R&B
"You Belong to Me" (featuring Michael McDonald) (2007) — #18 U.S. Hot Contemporary Jazz Songs
"One for All Time" (2008) — #35 U.S. R&B
"Disrespectful" (featuring Mary J. Blige) (2009) — #1 U.K. Music Week Commercial Pop

Charts

Weekly charts

Year-end charts

References

External links
Charts All Over the World

2007 albums
Albums produced by Jimmy Jam and Terry Lewis
Burgundy Records albums
Chaka Khan albums
Grammy Award for Best R&B Album